Blastobasis aequivoca is a moth in the  family Blastobasidae. It was described by Edward Meyrick in 1922. It is found in  Guyana.

References

Natural History Museum Lepidoptera generic names catalog

Blastobasis
Moths described in 1922
Moths of South America
Taxa named by Edward Meyrick